Slipstream 5000 is a 3D airplane combat/racing video game developed by The Software Refinery and published by Gremlin Interactive for IBM PC compatible computers in July 1995.

Release
The game is compatible with DOS as well as Windows 95 and Windows 98 via their native DOS support. Later versions of Windows based on the NT kernel have issues with running the game, but it can be run successfully via DOSBox. It was also distributed free with Classic Logitech Wingman Extreme Joysticks during the 1990s. GOG.com released an emulated version for Microsoft Windows, Linux and Mac OS X in 2011.

Slipstream was an unreleased conversion of Slipstream 5000 which in 1996 was being prepared for the Sony PlayStation platform's Japanese market (it was supposed to be later completely reshaped for its European release). Little was publicised about this title, besides its "urban manga" look as the ships were being designed by the Japanese manga artists. It was also in development for the Sega Saturn. Since the 2010s, it has been available for purchase via the website Good Old Games as well as Steam.

Reception

Although sales were not very high due to stiff competition from consoles, the game was generally well received, having 3D graphics and gameplay advanced for its time. While it was soon superseded by console games with superior graphics, Slipstream 5000 was later described as having been years ahead of its competition. PC Gamer magazine US rated it at 89%.

Next Generation reviewed the PC version of the game, rating it three stars out of five, and stated that "it's a very pretty game that happens to be even more fun to play than it is to look at."

References

External links

Slipstream 5000 at GameFAQs

1995 video games
Cancelled PlayStation (console) games
DOS games
Flight simulation video games
Science fiction racing games
Games commercially released with DOSBox
Gremlin Interactive games
Linux games
MacOS games
Windows games
Video games developed in the United Kingdom
Multiplayer and single-player video games